A by-election was held for the New South Wales Legislative Assembly electorate of Gordon on 8 November 1935 because of the resignation of Sir Thomas Bavin who had accepted an appointment as a Judge of the Supreme Court.

Dates

Result

The by-election was caused by resignation of Sir Thomas Bavin who had accepted an appointment as a Judge of the Supreme Court.

See also
Electoral results for the district of Gordon
List of New South Wales state by-elections

References

1935 elections in Australia
New South Wales state by-elections
1930s in New South Wales